The 2019 Netherlands Women's Quadrangular Series was a Women's Twenty20 International (WT20I) cricket tournament that was held in Deventer, Netherlands, from 8 to 14 August 2019. It took place ahead of the 2019 ICC Women's World Twenty20 Qualifier tournament in Scotland. The series was contested between the teams of Ireland, the Netherlands, Scotland and Thailand. All the matches took place at the Sportpark Het Schootsveld. Thailand won the series, after winning five of their six matches, with Scotland finishing second.

Summary
The opening round of fixtures saw Ireland beat the Netherlands by 79 runs and Thailand beat Scotland by 74 runs. On the second day, both matches were affected by rain, and were decided by the Duckworth–Lewis–Stern (DLS) method. Scotland beat the Netherlands by five runs, to leave the hosts without a win from their first two matches. Thailand's match against Ireland was initially reduced to 14 overs, before another delay with the bowler's run-up reduced the game to 10 overs per side. Thailand eventually won the match, beating Ireland by four runs. The first Ireland-Scotland encounter saw Scotland win by eleven runs in a close match. It was Scotland's first win against Ireland since 2011. Thailand beat the Netherlands by eight wickets to remain unbeaten in the tournament ahead of the rest day, with the hosts winless from their three matches. Thailand's win was their 17th win in a row, breaking the previous record of 16 consecutive wins in WT20I cricket set by Australia.

The first match after the rest day was between Scotland and Thailand, with Scotland ending Thailand's unbeaten streak. Scotland's captain, Sarah Bryce, scored four runs off the final ball of the match, to beat Thailand by five wickets. In Ireland's match against the Netherlands, Ireland scored 213/4, their highest total in a WT20I match. However, the match ended in a no result, with rain during the Netherlands' run chase. The penultimate round of matches saw Scotland beat the Netherlands by 62 runs, by the DLS method, to win their fourth consecutive match. Thailand beat Ireland by seven wickets, in another rain-affected match. Onnicha Kamchomphu became the first bowler for Thailand to take a hat-trick in a WT20I match, finishing with three wickets for twelve runs from the two overs she bowled. The final day of fixtures started with Ireland beating Scotland by nine wickets, with Gaby Lewis and Kim Garth setting a new record for the highest partnership for any wicket by Ireland in a WT20I match, with an unbeaten 113 runs. The last match of the tournament saw Thailand beat the Netherlands by 93 runs, after the hosts only scored 40 runs in their run chase.

Squads

Points table

Fixtures

References

External links
 Series home at ESPN Cricinfo

2019 in women's cricket
International cricket competitions in 2019
August 2019 sports events in Europe
International women's cricket competitions in the Netherlands
2019 in Dutch cricket
2019 in Irish cricket
2019 in Scottish cricket